Gav Mordeh may refer to:
 Gav Mordeh, Hormozgan
 Gav Mordeh, Kerman